The 1964 Brownlow Medal was the 37th year the award was presented to the player adjudged the fairest and best player during the Victorian Football League (VFL) home and away season. Gordon Collis of the Carlton Football Club won the medal by polling twenty-seven votes during the 1964 VFL season.

Leading votegetters

References 

1964 in Australian rules football
1964